Southwick railway station serves the town of Southwick in West Sussex, England. It is on the West Coastway Line,  from Brighton. It is operated by Southern. Its platforms are long enough for eight-coach trains.

Services
All services at Southwick are operated by Southern using  EMUs.

The typical off-peak service in trains per hour is:
 2 tph to 
 1 tph to 
 1 tph to 

References

External links

Adur District
Railway stations in West Sussex
DfT Category E stations
Former London, Brighton and South Coast Railway stations
Railway stations in Great Britain opened in 1840
Railway stations served by Govia Thameslink Railway